James N. Druckman (born 26 June 1971) is an American political scientist.

Druckman earned a bachelor's degree at Northwestern University in 1993, followed by a doctorate from the University of California, San Diego in 1999. He was an assistant professor at the University of Minnesota, and returned to Northwestern in 2005 as a faculty member, where he was appointed Payson S. Wild Professor of Political Science in 2009. In 2012, Druckman was elected to the American Academy of Arts and Sciences.

Druckman was a manuscript referee for Public Opinion Quarterly from 2003 to 2004. He and Nancy Mathiowetz were co-chief editors, and their joint tenure saw the publication of the journal's 75th anniversary edition.

Selected publications

References

1971 births
Living people
American political scientists
Fellows of the American Academy of Arts and Sciences
Northwestern University faculty
Northwestern University alumni
University of California, San Diego alumni
University of Minnesota faculty
Political science journal editors